The 1965–66 Gonzaga Bulldogs men's basketball team represented Gonzaga University during the 1965–66 NCAA University Division men's basketball season. In the third season of the Big Sky Conference, the Bulldogs were led by fifteenth-year head coach Hank Anderson and played their home games on campus at the new Kennedy Pavilion in Spokane, Washington.

Gonzaga and Weber State were co-champions of the Big Sky; it did not yet have an automatic berth to the 22-team NCAA tournament, which came two years later.

References

External links
Sports Reference – Gonzaga Bulldogs: 1965–66 basketball season

Gonzaga Bulldogs men's basketball seasons
Gonzaga